West End theatre is mainstream professional theatre staged in the large theatres in and near the West End of London. Along with New York City's Broadway theatre, West End theatre is usually considered to represent the highest level of commercial theatre in the English-speaking world. Seeing a West End show is a common tourist activity in London. Famous screen actors, British and international alike, frequently appear on the London stage.

There are a total of 39 theatres in the West End, with the Theatre Royal, Drury Lane, opened in May 1663, the oldest theatre in London. The Savoy Theatre – built as a showcase for the popular series of comic operas of Gilbert and Sullivan – was entirely lit by electricity in 1881. 

The Society of London Theatre (SOLT) announced that 2018 was a record year for the capital's theatre industry with attendances topping 15.5 million for the first time since the organisation began collecting audience data in 1986. Box office revenues exceeded £765 million. While attendance in 2019 was down 1.4% compared to the previous year, box office revenues reached a record £799 million.

The majority of West End theatres are owned by the Ambassador Theatre Group, Delfont Mackintosh Theatres, Nimax Theatres, LW Theatres, and the Nederlander Organization.

History

Theatre in London flourished after the English Reformation. The first permanent public playhouse, known as The Theatre, was constructed in 1576 in Shoreditch by James Burbage. It was soon joined by The Curtain. Both are known to have been used by William Shakespeare's company. In 1599, the timber from The Theatre was moved to Southwark, where it was used in building the Globe Theatre in a new theatre district formed beyond the controls of the City corporation. Regarding theatre as sinful, these theatres were closed in 1642 due to the Puritans who would later influence the interregnum of 1649. On 24 January 1643, the actors protested against the ban by writing a pamphlet titled The Actors remonstrance or complaint for the silencing of their profession, and banishment from their severall play-houses.

After the Restoration (1660), Puritan legislation was declared null and void, and theatre among other arts exploded. Two companies were licensed to perform, the Duke's Company and the King's Company. Performances were held in converted buildings, such as Lisle's Tennis Court. The first West End theatre, known as Theatre Royal in Bridges Street, was designed by Thomas Killigrew and built on the site of the present Theatre Royal, Drury Lane. It opened on 7 May 1663 and was destroyed by a fire nine years later. It was replaced by a new structure designed by Christopher Wren and renamed the Theatre Royal, Drury Lane. One of the first actresses on the stage, Nell Gwyn became a star of restoration comedy.

Outside the West End, Sadler's Wells Theatre opened in Islington on 3 June 1683. Taking its name from founder Richard Sadler and monastic springs that were discovered on the property, it operated as a "Musick House", with performances of opera; as it was not licensed for plays. In the West End, the Theatre Royal Haymarket opened on 29 December 1720 on a site slightly north of its current location, and the Royal Opera House opened in Covent Garden on 7 December 1732. John Gay's ballad opera The Beggar's Opera ran for 62 performances in 1728, and held the record for London's longest run for nearly a century. It has been called "the most popular play of the eighteenth century." Another musical show, Tom and Jerry, or Life in London (1821), was the first London production to reach 100 consecutive performances. Tom and Jerry'''s combination of a tour of London interspersed with song and dance, gave rise to numerous similar, loosely constructed entertainments, and "planted the seeds for later musical comedy and revue".

The Patent theatre companies retained their duopoly on drama well into the 19th century, and all other theatres could perform only musical entertainments. By the early 19th century, however, music hall entertainments became popular, and presenters found a loophole in the restrictions on non-patent theatres in the genre of melodrama. Melodrama did not break the Patent Acts, as it was accompanied by music. Initially, these entertainments were presented in large halls, attached to public houses, but purpose-built theatres began to appear in the East End, such as the Pavilion Theatre in Whitechapel. The comic theatrical genre the harlequinade was also popular among London audiences. Its most famous performer, Joseph Grimaldi, best known for developing the modern day white-face clown, made his stage debut at Drury Lane in 1780.

The West End theatre district became established with the opening of many small theatres and halls, including the Adelphi in The Strand on 17 November 1806. South of the River Thames, the Old Vic, Waterloo Road, opened on 11 May 1818. The expansion of the West End theatre district gained pace with the Theatres Act 1843, which relaxed the conditions for the performance of plays, and The Strand gained another venue when the Vaudeville opened on 16 April 1870. The next few decades saw the opening of many new theatres in the West End. 
 

The Criterion Theatre opened on Piccadilly Circus on 21 March 1874, and in 1881, two more houses appeared: the Savoy Theatre in The Strand, built by Richard D'Oyly Carte specifically to showcase the comic operas of Gilbert and Sullivan, opened on 10 October (the first theatre to be lit by cooler, cleaner electric lights), and five days later the Comedy Theatre opened as the Royal Comedy Theatre on Panton Street in Leicester Square. It abbreviated its name three years later. On 23 December 1886, Alice in Wonderland (the first major production of the Alice books) debuted at the Prince of Wales Theatre. Lewis Carroll attended a performance seven days later. The Palace Theatre opened in 1891. Opened in 1892, the Duke of York's Theatre saw the debut of J. M. Barrie’s play, Peter Pan, or The Boy Who Wouldn't Grow Up, on 27 December 1904.

One of the most popular playwrights in London in the 1890s, Oscar Wilde premiered his second comedy, A Woman of No Importance, at Haymarket Theatre in 1893. The subject of widespread public and media interest, Lillie Langtry (an associate of Wilde) made her West End debut in the comedy She Stoops to Conquer in 1881. In 1878, Ellen Terry joined Henry Irving's company as his leading lady, and for more than the next two decades she was considered the leading Shakespearean and comic actress in Britain. Opened in 1903, the New Theatre debuted The Scarlet Pimpernel in 1905, a play that introduced a heroic figure with an alter ego into the public consciousness. The theatre was renamed the Noël Coward Theatre in 2006 after the playwright Noël Coward. Constructed in 1897, Her Majesty's Theatre hosted a number of premieres, including George Bernard Shaw's Pygmalion in 1914. The theatre building boom continued until about the First World War.

In 1930, Laurence Olivier had his first important West End success in Noël Coward's Private Lives. A number of other actors made their West End debut prior to the Second World War, including John Gielgud, Alec Guinness and Vivien Leigh. During the 1950s and 1960s, many plays were produced in theatre clubs, to evade the censorship then exercised by the Lord Chamberlain's Office. The Theatres Act 1968 finally abolished censorship of the stage in the United Kingdom.

Theatreland

"Theatreland", London's main theatre district, contains approximately 40 venues and is located in and near the heart of the West End of London. It is traditionally defined by the Strand to the south, Oxford Street to the north, Regent Street to the west, and Kingsway to the east, but a few other nearby theatres are also considered "West End" despite being outside the area proper (e.g. The Apollo Victoria Theatre, in Westminster). Prominent theatre streets include Drury Lane, Shaftesbury Avenue and the Strand. The works staged are predominantly musicals, classic and modern straight plays, and comedy performances.

Many theatres in the West End are of late Victorian or Edwardian construction and are privately owned. Many are architecturally impressive, and the largest and best maintained feature grand neo-classical, Romanesque, or Victorian façades and luxurious, detailed interior design and decoration.

However, owing to the age of the buildings, leg room is often cramped, and audience facilities such as bars and toilets are often much smaller than in modern theatres. The protected status of the buildings and their confined urban locations, combined with financial constraints, make it very difficult to make substantial improvements to the level of comfort offered. In 2003, the Theatres Trust estimated that an investment of £250 million over the following 15 years was required for modernisation, and stated that 60% of theatres had seats from which the stage was not fully visible. The theatre owners unsuccessfully requested tax concessions to help them meet the costs.

From 2004 onwards there were several incidents of falling plasterwork, or performances being cancelled because of urgent building repairs being required. These events culminated in the partial collapse of the ceiling of the Apollo Theatre in December 2013. Of these earlier incidents, only one led to people being hurt, but at the Apollo 76 people needed medical treatment for their injuries. A number of West End theatres have undergone refurbishments, including the Victoria Palace Theatre following the run of Billy Elliot in 2016. The Dominion Theatre refurbishment was completed in 2017 with the unveiling of a new double-sided LED screen, the largest and highest resolution projecting screen on the exterior of a West End theatre.

In 2012, gross sales of £529,787,692 were up 0.27% and attendances also increased 0.56% to 13,992,773-year-on-year. In 2013, sales again rose this time by 11% to £585,506,455, with attendances rising to 14,587,276. This was despite slightly fewer performances occurring in 2013.

On 16 March 2020, following government advice due to the COVID-19 pandemic, all theatres in the West End were closed until further notice. Theatres in London were allowed to re-open (with social distancing) on 17 May 2021, with full capacity permitted from 19 July. Opening in October 2022, @sohoplace is the first new West End theatre in 50 years.

Long-running shows

The length of West End shows depends on ticket sales. The longest-running musical in West End history is Les Misérables, produced by Cameron Mackintosh, which has been running in London since October 1985. It overtook Andrew Lloyd Webber's Cats, which closed in 2002 after running for 8,949 performances and 21 years, as the longest-running West End musical of all time on 9 October 2006. Other long-runners include Lloyd Webber's The Phantom of the Opera, Willy Russell's Blood Brothers, and Abba jukebox musical Mamma Mia! which have also subsequently overtaken Cats. However, the non-musical Agatha Christie play The Mousetrap is the longest-running production in the world, and has been performed continuously since 1952.

Running since 2011, Matilda the Musical, an adaptation of Roald Dahl's Matilda, won a then-record seven Olivier Awards in 2012. Running since 2016, Harry Potter and the Cursed Child, a two-part play written by Jack Thorne based on an original story by J. K. Rowling, won a record-breaking nine Olivier Awards in 2017.

List of West End theatres
 An * after the opening date indicates that the listed show has not yet opened, but is scheduled to open on the given date at that theatre.
 An * after the closing date indicates that there is another production scheduled for this theatre.
 If the next show planned is not announced, the applicable columns are left blank.

Forthcoming productions
The following have been announced as future West End productions. The theatre in which they will run is either not yet known or currently occupied by another show.

London's non-commercial theatres

The term "West End theatre" is generally used to refer specifically to commercial productions in Theatreland. However, the leading non-commercial theatres in London enjoy great artistic prestige. These include the National Theatre, the Barbican Centre, Shakespeare's Globe (including the Sam Wanamaker Playhouse), the Old Vic, Royal Court Theatre, Sadler's Wells Theatre, and the Regent's Park Open Air Theatre. These theatres stage a high proportion of straight drama, Shakespeare, other classic plays and premieres of new plays by leading playwrights—David Hare's play Pravda'' starring Anthony Hopkins was described as "one of the biggest hits in the history of the National Theatre." Successful productions from the non-commercial theatres sometimes transfer to one of the commercial West End houses for an extended run.

The Royal Opera House is widely regarded as one of the greatest opera houses in the world, comparable with the Palais Garnier and La Scala. Commonly known simply as Covent Garden due to its location, it is home to the Royal Opera, Royal Ballet and a resident symphony orchestra, and hosts guest performances from other leading opera, ballet and performance companies from around the world. In 1735 its first season of operas, by George Frideric Handel, began and many of his English oratorios were specifically written for Covent Garden and had their premieres here.

Likewise, the London Coliseum is the resident home to the English National Opera. The theatre is also the London base for performances by the English National Ballet, who perform regular seasons throughout the year when not on tour.

The Peacock Theatre is located on the edge of the Theatreland area. Now owned by the London School of Economics and Political Science, it is used in the evenings for dance performances by Sadler's Wells, who manage the theatre on behalf of the school.

Other London theatres
There is a great number of stage productions in London outside the West End. Much of this is known as fringe theatre (referred to as Off West End) which is the equivalent of off-Broadway and off-off-Broadway theatre in New York City. Among these are the Bush Theatre and the Donmar Warehouse. Fringe venues range from well-equipped small theatres to rooms above pubs, and the performances range from classic plays, to cabaret, to plays in the languages of London's ethnic minorities. The performers range from emerging young professionals to amateurs.

There are many theatres located throughout Greater London, such as the Lyric Hammersmith, Theatre Royal Stratford East, Rose Theatre, Kingston, New Wimbledon Theatre, the Rudolf Steiner Theatre in Westminster, the Ashcroft Theatre in Croydon, Secombe Theatre in Sutton and the Churchill Theatre in Bromley.

London theatres outside the West End also played an important role in the early history of drama schools. In 1833, actress Frances Maria Kelly managed the Royal Strand Theatre in Westminster where she funded and operated a dramatic school, the earliest record of a drama school in England. In 1840 she financed the Royalty Theatre in Soho which opened as Miss Kelly's Theatre and Dramatic School.

Awards

There are a number of annual awards for outstanding achievements in London theatre:
Laurence Olivier Awards
Evening Standard Theatre Awards
WhatsOnStage Awards
Critics' Circle Theatre Awards
National Dance Awards
West End Cares Awards
West End Frame Awards

See also

Culture of London
List of London venues
Great West End Theatres
List of former theatres in London

Notes

External links
 Society of London Theatre – trade body for the London theatre industry
 London's West End Theatres Information and archive material on London's historic West End Theatres.

 

Entertainment districts in the United Kingdom